Hector Berthelot (March 4, 1842 –  September 15, 1895) was a Canadian lawyer, journalist, columnist, satirist, caricaturist, photographer and publisher  who was born in Trois-Rivières. He was not married and died in Montreal. He is most well known for founding various satirical magazines, of which Le Canard was the most famous.

Biography

Hector completed his education at the Collège Sainte-Marie in Montreal. Berthelot articled as a lawyer with George-Étienne Cartier in 1861 and was called to the bar in 1865. However, he did not practice law but began with his journalistic pursuits for which he would become well known. He did practice law extensively but it was journalism and publishing that interested him most. One of his publishing endeavours, Le Canard, became a rapid success. He turned this publication over to Honoré Beaugrand in August 1879. He immediately launched other publications.
 
Hector Berthelot was mourned after his death by his contemporaries in the newspapers. All the tributes seem to indicate an accomplished humorist and a journalist of the first order.

His niece Henriette Tassé also became a journalist and published a 1934 biography of Berthelot La vie humoristique d'Hector Berthelot.

References

External links 
 
 Biography at the Dictionary of Canadian Biography Online
 The Canadian Encyclopedia
 Satirical Newspapers of the 19th Century

1842 births
1895 deaths
Artists from Quebec
Canadian male journalists
Canadian publishers (people)
Canadian cartoonists
Canadian caricaturists
Canadian comics artists
Canadian columnists
Canadian satirists
Canadian photographers
Canadian educators
Journalists from Quebec
People from Trois-Rivières
19th-century Canadian journalists
19th-century Canadian male writers